Çetiner Erdoğan (21 November 1949 – 16 October 2017) is a retired Turkish footballer who played as a winger.

References

External link
Mackolik Profile
TFF Profile

1949 births
2017 deaths
Sportspeople from Kars
Turkish footballers
Turkey international footballers
Turkey youth international footballers
Turkish football managers
Boluspor footballers
Süper Lig players
TFF First League players
Boluspor managers
Association football forwards